El Angel is a town located in the northern Andes of Ecuador, capital of the Espejo canton in the Carchi province.

Basic Information 

 Population: 4,497 Hab (2010).
 Altitude: 3007 m.
 Average temperature: 12 °C. 
 Climate: Cold Highland.
 Canton festivities: September 27.

History 

Prehispanic settlements were confirmed due to the ceramic remains found in the sector of Las Tres Tolas.
In 1851, El Angel became a parish of the Tulcan canton . From the twentieth century, new road infrastructure from El Ángel towards Tulcán and Ibarra cities, promoted the development of the town and the canton. The September 27, 1934 the Espejo canton was created, being its capital El Angel.

Economy 

The main economic activities of the population are public, private services and trade, that are performed inside and outside the city; and secondary activities as agriculture, floriculture and livestock production.

Tourist Attractions 

 Bellavista Mirador.
 Church of El Angel. 
 Monuments La Botiluela and Nuevo Milenio.
 Thermal spas La Calera.
 Archaeological Museum.
 El Angel Ecological Reserve.

Access Routes 
 From the Pan-American Highway 
 Road: Bolívar – El Ángel.
 Road: Mascarilla – Mira – El Ángel.

References 

1.	Asociación de Municipalidades del Ecuador. “Plan de Desarrollo del Cantón Espejo”, Vol. 1, Ed. Dirección Técnica AME.

Notes 

Populated places in Carchi Province